The year 2001 is the 13th year in the history of Shooto, a mixed martial arts promotion based in the Japan. In 2001 Shooto held 21 events beginning with, Shooto: To The Top 1.

Title fights

Events list

Shooto: To The Top 1

Shooto: To The Top 1 was an event held on January 19, 2001, at Korakuen Hall in Tokyo, Japan.

Results

Shooto: Gig West 1

Shooto: Gig West 1 was an event held on February 18, 2001, at the Namba Grand Kagetsu Studio in Osaka, Japan.

Results

Shooto: To The Top 2

Shooto: To The Top 2 was an event held on March 2, 2001, at Korakuen Hall in Tokyo, Japan.

Results

Shooto: To The Top 3

Shooto: To The Top 3 was an event held on March 21, 2001, at Kitazawa Town Hall in Setagaya, Tokyo, Japan.

Results

Shooto: Wanna Shooto 2001

Shooto: Wanna Shooto 2001 was an event held on April 8, 2001, at Kitazawa Town Hall in Setagaya, Tokyo, Japan.

Results

Shooto: Gig East 1

Shooto: Gig East 1 was an event held on April 28, 2001, at Kitazawa Town Hall in Tokyo, Japan.

Results

Shooto: To The Top 4

Shooto: To The Top 4 was an event held on May 1, 2001, at Korakuen Hall in Tokyo, Japan.

Results

Shooto: Gig East 2

Shooto: Gig East 2 was an event held on May 22, 2001, at Kitazawa Town Hall in Tokyo, Japan.

Results

Shooto: Gig East 3

Shooto: Gig East 3 was an event held on December 17, 2001, at Kitazawa Town Hall in Tokyo, Japan.

Results

Shooto: To The Top 5

Shooto: To The Top 5 was an event held on June 30, 2001, at Kitazawa Town Hall in Setagaya, Tokyo, Japan.

Results

Shooto: To The Top 6

Shooto: To The Top 6 was an event held on July 6, 2001, at Korakuen Hall in Tokyo, Japan.

Results

Shooto: Gig East 4

Shooto: Gig East 4 was an event held on July 27, 2001, at Kitazawa Town Hall in Tokyo, Japan.

Results

Shooto: Gig East 5

Shooto: Gig East 5 was an event held on August 15, 2001, at The Kitazawa Town Hall in Tokyo, Japan.

Results

Shooto: To The Top 7

Shooto: To The Top 7 was an event held on August 26, 2001, at The Osaka Prefectural Gymnasium in Osaka, Japan.

Results

Shooto: To The Top 8

Shooto: To The Top 8 was an event held on September 2, 2001, at Korakuen Hall in Tokyo, Japan.

Results

Shooto: Gig West 2

Shooto: Gig West 2 was an event held on September 23, 2001, at The Namba Grand Kagetsu Studio in Osaka, Japan.

Results

Shooto: To The Top 9

Shooto: To The Top 9 was an event held on September 27, 2001, at The Kitazawa Town Hall in Tokyo, Japan.

Results

Shooto: Gig East 6

Shooto: Gig East 6 was an event held on October 23, 2001, at The Kitazawa Town Hall in Tokyo, Japan.

Results

Shooto: To The Top 10

Shooto: To The Top 10 was an event held on November 25, 2001, at The Differ Ariake Arena in Tokyo, Japan.

Results

Shooto: Gig East 7

Shooto: Gig East 7 was an event held on November 26, 2001, at The Kitazawa Town Hall in Tokyo, Japan.

Results

Shooto: To The Top Final Act

Shooto: To The Top Final Act was an event held on December 16, 2001, at The Tokyo Bay NK Hall in Urayasu, Chiba, Japan.

Results

See also 
 Shooto
 List of Shooto champions
 List of Shooto Events

References

Shooto events
2001 in mixed martial arts